Captain Fracasse (French: Le Capitaine Fracasse) is a 1943 French-Italian historical adventure film directed by Abel Gance and starring Fernand Gravey, Assia Noris and Alice Tissot. It is an adaptation of the novel Captain Fracasse by Théophile Gautier. The scenario and dialogue is by Abel Gance and Claude Vermorel and the music composed by Arthur Honegger. Honegger's score for the film (H. 166 in his catalogue of works) consists of around 50 minutes of music for chorus and large orchestra.

On the same subject, there were also a 1929 silent version directed by Alberto Cavalcanti, and a 1961 colour version directed by Pierre Gaspard-Huit both with the same title.

Cast 
 Fernand Gravey as the Baron de Sigognac (later Capitaine Fracasse)
 Assia Noris as Isabelle
 Jean Weber as the Duc de Vallombreuse
 Alice Tissot as Dame Léonarde
 Vina Bovy as Séraphine
 Maurice Escande as the Marquis de Bruyères 
 Roland Toutain as Scapin 
 Lucien Nat as Agostin 
 Mona Goya as the Marquise de Bruyères 
 Paul Œttly as Matamore 
 Jacques François as the Chevalier de Vidalenc, friend of Vallombreuse
 Mary Lou as Yolande de Foix
 Jean Fleur as Blazius
 Nino Costantini as Léandre
 Josette France as Zerbine
 Roger Blin as Fagotin
 Paul Mondollot as Pierre

Synopsis 
Set in the mid 17th century, the young Baron de Sigognac lives alone, ruined, in his castle. A troupe of travelling players stop in the castle ward and are offered hospitality by Sigognac, who remarks the beauty of the actress Isabelle. He decides to follow the troupe on their journeys.

The old leader of the troupe, Matamore dies and Sigognac replaces him using the pseudonym Capitaine Fracasse. He is enthusiastically received but has a rival for the attentions of Isabelle in the Duc de Vallombreuse. They fight a duel in a cemetery in Poitiers.

Afterwards, Vallombreuse manages to abduct Isabelle and imprison her in his castle. Sigognac-Fracasse comes to the rescue and another duel ensues. Then it is revealed that Isabelle is in fact the rich descendant and the sister of Vallombreuse. Sigognac finally marries her.

References

1943 films
1940s historical films
French black-and-white films
French historical films
Italian historical films
1940s French-language films
Films directed by Abel Gance
Films based on Captain Fracasse
Films set in the 17th century
Films scored by Arthur Honegger
Lux Film films
1940s French films
1940s Italian films